The Kiblah School is a historic school building in rural Miller County, Arkansas.  It is located southeast of Doddridge, at the junction of County Roads 4 and 192, between United States Route 71 and the Red River.  The building is a single-story L-shaped wood-frame structure, topped by a gable-on-hip roof.  It has modest Craftsman styling, with some Greek Revival influences.  The main entrance is sheltered by a hip-roofed porch supported by Craftsman-style columns.  It has a transom window reminiscent of Greek Revival doorways.  The school was built in 1927 with funding from the Rosenwald Fund (although it was not built to a standard Rosenwald plan), and was intended to serve the African-American community of Kiblah, which was established after the American Civil War by former slaves from a Louisiana plantation.

The building was listed on the National Register of Historic Places in 1989.

See also
National Register of Historic Places listings in Miller County, Arkansas

References

School buildings on the National Register of Historic Places in Arkansas
School buildings completed in 1927
Buildings and structures in Miller County, Arkansas
National Register of Historic Places in Miller County, Arkansas
1927 establishments in Arkansas